Avenay is a commune in the Calvados department in the Normandy region of north-western France.

Geography
Avenay is located some 12 km south-west of Caen just east of Évrecy. Access to the commune is by the D36 road from Sainte-Honorine-du-Fay in the south-west which passes through the heart of the commune and the village and continues north to join the D8. Apart from the village there is the hamlet of La Coquerie on the eastern border. The commune consists entirely of farmland.

The Guigne river flows along the northern border of the commune towards the east where it joins the Orne south of Bully.

History
The oldest traces of Avenay village date from Gallo-Roman times. In 1820-1821 some remains of Gallo-Roman houses were found. In the Middle Ages, the village depended on the Bishop of Bayeux.

In 1827 Avenay (336 inhabitants in 1821) absorbed Fierville-en-Bessin (68 people) in the east of its territory.

Administration

List of Successive Mayors

Demography
In 2017 the commune had 557 inhabitants. This table includes the population of Fierville-en-Bassin prior to 1827.

Sites and Monuments

The Church of Mary of the Assumption (Reconstruction).
Ruins of the Church of Fierville.
The Chateau of Fierville (16th century).
Pompierre Manor (15th century).

Activities and events
Each year, during the 3rd weekend in June, the Festival Committee of Avenay organises an inter-regional competition of bread.

One hundred bakers are judged every year. The competition focuses on different types of bread: Pain brié, Pain de campagne, traditional Baguettes, Croissants etc.

The jury, composed of baking professionals and consumers, use many criteria of quality and presentation.

The results are announced on Sunday afternoon at the fair in the village. The fair begins with a snack of Tripe at 9 am which brings hundreds of gourmands. The day continues with Mass and an exceptional sale of gold tripe.

On this day, the bakers make bread and pastries using bakery equipment and ovens installed specially for the festival. Visitors can buy bread made before their eyes.

The school fair is also held on the same day. On this occasion the students of the school perform several Norman dances in traditional costumes.

See also
 Communes of the Calvados department

References

External links
Avenay on Géoportail, National Geographic Institute (IGN) website 
Avenay on the 1750 Cassini Map

Communes of Calvados (department)